Monsignor Alojz Tkáč (born March 2, 1934, in Ohradzany, Slovakia) is Slovak bishop, he was the first archbishop of the Košice Episcopal see (1995 to 2010), nowadays archbishop emeritus.

He is a "golden" blood-donor (75 donations).

References 

1934 births
Living people
People from Humenné District
20th-century Roman Catholic archbishops in Slovakia
21st-century Roman Catholic archbishops in Slovakia